Rancho Pecho y Islay was an  Mexican land grant in the Irish Hills, Montaña de Oro State Park and Diablo Canyon Power Plant in present-day San Luis Obispo County, California.

History 
Rancho Pecho y Islay was granted in 1843 by Governor Manuel Micheltorena to Francisco Badillo. The Rancho Pecho y Islay grant was a strip of coastal plain along the Pacific Ocean that ran from Islay Creek to Pecho Creek and up that creek to the summit of the Irish Hills to the "boundry with the land of Don Victor Linares," (Rancho Cañada de los Osos). It includes the southern part of Montaña de Oro State Park and the site of the  Diablo Canyon Power Plant.

The Rancho Pecho y Islay was sold by Francisco Badillo in 1844 to James Scott and John Wilson.  That year they also purchased the Rancho Cañada de los Osos from Victor Linares.  The grants were consolidated in the 1845 grant of Rancho Cañada de los Osos y Pecho y Islay by Governor Pío Pico, to James Scott and John Wilson, after they had been purchased from the original grantees.

See also
Montaña de Oro State Park
Ranchos of San Luis Obispo County, California
List of Ranchos of California

References

California ranchos
Ranchos of San Luis Obispo County, California
San Luis Obispo, California
Cañada